The 2012–13 Maltese FA Trophy was the 75th season since its establishment. For the second season, the competition will include all teams from Malta and Gozo. The competition began on 5 September 2012 and is ended on 19 May 2013 with the Final in Ta' Qali Stadium. The defending champions are Hibernians, having won their 9th Maltese Cup last season.  The winner will qualify to the first qualifying round of the 2013–14 UEFA Europa League.

Hibernians were the defending champions, and they retain the trophy.

Calendar
Matches began on 5 September 2012 and concluded with the final on 19 May 2013.

First round
Entering this round were clubs from the Maltese Third Division, the Gozo Football League First Division and the Gozo Football League Second Division. These matches took place between 5 and 11 September 2012.

|colspan="3" style="background:#fcc;"|5 September 2012

|-
|colspan="3" style="background:#fcc;"|6 September 2012

|-
|colspan="3" style="background:#fcc;"|8 September 2012

|-
|colspan="3" style="background:#fcc;"|9 September 2012

|-
|colspan="3" style="background:#fcc;"|11 September 2012

|}

Second round
Entering this round were the 14 winners from the First Round along with the 12 Maltese First Division clubs and the 14 Maltese Second Division clubs. These matches took place between 19 and 21 October 2012.

|colspan="3" style="background:#fcc;"|19 October 2012

|-
|colspan="3" style="background:#fcc;"|20 October 2012

|-
|colspan="3" style="background:#fcc;"|21 October 2012

|}

Third round
Entering this round were the 20 winners from the Second Round along with the 12 Maltese Premier League clubs. These matches took place between 30 November and 2 December 2012.

|colspan="3" style="background:#fcc;"|30 November 2012

|-
|colspan="3" style="background:#fcc;"|1 December 2012

|-
|colspan="3" style="background:#fcc;"|2 December 2012

|}

Fourth round
Entering this round were the 16 winners from the Third Round. These matches took place between 20 and 23 January 2013.

|colspan="3" style="background:#fcc;"|20 January 2013

|-
|colspan="3" style="background:#fcc;"|22 January 2013

|-
|colspan="3" style="background:#fcc;"|23 January 2013

|}

Quarter-finals
Entering this round were the 8 winners from the Fourth Round. These matches took place on 17 February 2013. 

|colspan="3" style="background:#fcc;"|17 February 2013

|}

Semi-finals
Entering this round were the four winners from the Quarterfinals.

Final
Entering this round were the two winners from the Semifinals.

References

External links
 Official site

Maltese Cup
Cup
Maltese FA Trophy seasons